Report on Water for Brewing Tea (煎茶水记) is a tea monograph by Tang dynasty author Zhang Youxin (张又新) from 814. This book is the earliest monograph wholly devoted to the quality of water for brewing tea.

Content
 A short list of water sources from seven locations, ranked from 1 to 7:
 Nanling of Yangtze river.
 Wuxi Hui Mountain Temple Spring
 Suzhou Tiger Hill Temple Spring
 Danyang Guanyin Temple
 Yangzhou Da Ming temple
 Wuzhong River
 Huai River
 Temple of Small gods fountain.  
 An anecdote about Lu Yu's marvellous ability as water connoisseur.
 A longer list of water quality ranking from twenty locations.

Chinese tea classic texts
9th-century Chinese books
Tang dynasty literature
814
9th century in China